Sergei Botschkov is a Soviet ski jumper who competed from 1972 to 1974. His lone victory was at Innsbruck during the 1972-73 Four Hills Tournament.

References

1949 births
Russian male ski jumpers
Soviet male ski jumpers
2004 deaths